James Durham may refer to:

 James Durham (baseball) (1881–1949), pitcher in Major League Baseball
 James Durham (minister), Church of Scotland minister
 James R. Durham (1833–1904), Union Army officer and Medal of Honor recipient
 James J. Durham (1849–1920), Baptist minister in South Carolina and the founder of Morris College
 Jim Durham (1947–2012), American sportscaster 
 James Derham (1762–1802?), also known as James Durham, the first African American to formally practice medicine in the United States